Miguel Faust Rocha (1898–1961) was an Argentine stage and film actor.

Selected filmography
 Resurrection (Spanish-language version) (1931)
 Lost Kisses (1945)
 The Three Rats (1946)

References

Bibliography
 Goble, Alan. The Complete Index to Literary Sources in Film. Walter de Gruyter, 1999.

External links

1898 births
1961 deaths
Argentine male film actors
Argentine male stage actors
People from Buenos Aires